The South Pacific Tennis Classic, also known as the South Pacific Championships was a men's tennis tournament played in Melbourne, Australia in 1974 and 1975, and in Brisbane, Australia from 1976 through 1981.  The event was part of the Grand Prix tennis circuit and was played on outdoor grass courts from 1976.

Past finals

Singles

Doubles

Notes

References

Defunct tennis tournaments in Australia 
Grand Prix tennis circuit
Grass court tennis tournaments
1974 establishments in Australia
1981 disestablishments in Australia
Recurring sporting events established in 1974
Recurring sporting events disestablished in 1981